Aguni was an Ukuru-class escort ship of the Imperial Japanese Navy during the Second World War and was named after the Aguni Islands. She was launched on 21 September 1944. The ship was heavily damaged by a U.S. Bat radar-guided glide bomb on 27 May 1945 although the damage is often miscredited as from a mine. The ship was scrapped on 20 May 1948.

References

1944 ships
Ukuru-class escort ships
Ships built in Japan